Presidential primary elections were held in Uruguay on 30 June 2019 in order to nominate the presidential candidate for every political party.

Broad Front

Background 
The Broad Front is the party of incumbent president Tabaré Vázquez, which was unable to seek reelection due to constitutional term limits, so it had to pick a new presidential nominee. This primary was also considered a generation change of the Broad Front, due to the lack of presence of historically dominant names such as Tabaré Vázquez, José Mujica and Danilo Astori.

Candidates

Results 
During non-mandatory primary voting on June 30, 2019 Daniel Martinez, the former Intendant of Montevideo, won his party's endorsement.

National Party 
The National Party has been the main opposition party since the 2004 election. Its nomination is contested by the following candidates:
Senator Jorge Larrañaga
Intendant of Maldonado Enrique Antía
Businessman Juan Sartori
Senator Luis Alberto Lacalle Pou
Deputy Representative Carlos Iafigliola

During non-mandatory primary voting on June 30, 2019 Luis Alberto Lacalle Pou, the son of the former President of Uruguay Luis Alberto Lacalle, won his party's endorsement. Multimillionaire, Juan Sartori, came in a distant second place.

Colorado Party
The Colorado Party nomination is contested by the following candidates: 
Senator José Amorín Batlle
Pedro Etchegaray
Edgardo Martínez Zimarioff
Former President of the Republic Julio María Sanguinetti
Economist Ernesto Talvi

During non-mandatory primary voting on June 30, 2019 Ernesto Talvi, an economist and relative newcomer to politics, won his party's endorsement by beating the two-time former president Julio María Sanguinetti.

See also 

 2019 Uruguayan general election

Bibliography

References

External links
, from Electoral Court of Uruguay

Uruguayan presidential primaries
Presidential primaries
Elections in Uruguay
Uruguayan presidential primaries